Renneria kamouni is a species of beetle in the family Carabidae, the only species in the genus Renneria.

References

Lebiinae